Andheri East constituency is one of the 26 Vidhan Sabha constituencies located in Mumbai Suburban district.

It is a segment of the Mumbai North West Lok Sabha constituency along with five other Vidhan Sabha segments, namely Goregaon, Versova, Jogeshwari East, Dindoshi and Andheri West in Mumbai Suburban district.

Members of Vidhan Sabha

^ bypoll

Election results

2022 Bypoll

Assembly elections 2019

Assembly elections 2014

Assembly elections 2009

References

Assembly constituencies of Mumbai
Assembly constituencies of Maharashtra
Politics of Mumbai Suburban district